Ben Crawford (born 1982) is a singer and performer, currently playing the lead role of The Phantom in the Broadway production of The Phantom of the Opera.

Born and raised in Tucson, Arizona, Crawford received a BFA in Music Theatre from the University of Arizona. He made his Broadway debut in 2006 in Les Misérables as the understudy for Jean Valjean and Javert.

On June 22, 2022 he announced his engagement via Instagram to former-Phantom costar, Kelsey Connolly.

The Phantom of the Opera 
Crawford made his debut performance in The Phantom of the Opera on April 16, 2018, following the tenure of Peter Joback. After a hiatus due to the COVID-19 pandemic, Crawford returned to the role in October 2021 and is set to be the final Phantom when the show closes after a record 35 year run on Broadway.

He has no relation to originator of the role, Michael Crawford.

Stage Appearances 

 The Phantom of the Opera - The Phantom (2018 - present)
 Charlie and the Chocolate Factory - Mr. Salt
 On the 20th Century - Ensemble, u/s Bruce Granit & Max Jacobs
 Big Fish - Don Price
 Shrek The Musical - u/s Shrek & Lord Farquaad, later took over the role of Shrek
 Les Misérables - Courfeyrac/Factory Foreman/Brujon/Champmathieu, u/s Jean Valjean & Javert

Regional Theater Appearances  
 Evita - Che (Tennessee)
 110 in the Shade - Bill Starbuck (Washington, D.C.)
 South Pacific - Luther Billis (Maine)
 Guys and Dolls - Sky Masterson (Tour)
 Titanic - Frederick Barrett (Missouri)
 Oklahoma! - Jud Fry (Atlanta)

References 

1982 births
21st-century American male actors
21st-century American male singers
21st-century American singers
American male musical theatre actors
Living people